The men's pole vault at the 1938 European Athletics Championships was held in Paris, France, at Stade Olympique de Colombes on 3 September 1938.

Medalists

Results

Final
3 September

Participation
According to an unofficial count, 14 athletes from 12 countries participated in the event.

 (1)
 (2)
 (1)
 (1)
 (2)
 (1)
 (1)
 (1)
 (1)
 (1)
 (1)
 (1)

References

Pole vault
Pole vault at the European Athletics Championships